Basabdatta Chatterjee is a Bengali actress who mainly works in Bengali television serials. She made her debut in the popular soap Gaaner Oparey directed by Rituparno Ghosh. She rose to fame by acting in the lead female role in the comedy soap Boyei Gelo, which aired on Zee Bangla. But later, due to other engagements, she stopped acting in the serial. Boyei Gelo was Basabdatta's seventh work. Subsequently, she worked in a daily soap Mon Niye Kachakachi on Star Jalsha, where she acted the role of Dr. Labanya Sanyal Kapoor. Currently, she acts as Netaji Subash Chandra Bose's mother Prabhabati Devi on Zee Bangla's daily soap Netaji.

Basabdatta's first movie was 'Labour of Love' (Asha Jaoar Majhe) which was released on 2 September 2014. She starred in a lead role alongside her co-actor was Ritwick Chakraborty in the movie which was directed by Aditya Vikram Sengupta. She was selected by the director after he found her impressive performance in her first serial Ganer Opaarey. The film won 62nd National Award in 2015 in the category of Best First Film of a Director and Best Audiography. It was screened at the 11th Venice Days Film Festival and many other festivals. In May 2015 New York Indian Film Festival (NYIFF), it was awarded in 3 categories – Best Director, Best Screenplay and Best Film.

Personal life 

Basabdatta was born in Kolkata in West Bengal. She passed Madhyamik from Lee Memorial Girls High School, Higher Secondary from Brahmo Balika Shikshalaya and graduated from Gokhale Memorial Girls' College. In 2013, she completed her master's degree in Bengali from Rabindra Bharati University.
On 6 March 2018 she was married to journalist Anirban Biswas.

Career 
Basabdatta's father, Sumantra Chatterjee, was a film reviewer. So initially, she wanted to become a reporter. She had basically no plans for entering the glamour world. But she came to limelight when she made her debut in the soap Ganer Opaarey, directed by Rituparno Ghosh. She is also a model for several jewellery and clothing brands. Basabdatta is equally popular in both West Bengal and Bangladesh.

Television 
Basabdatta has appeared in several television serials, including Gaaner Oparey, Boyei Gelo and Mon Niye Kachakachi. She has also appeared in the television game show Dadagiri Unlimited on Zee Bangla and Ebar Jalsha Rannaghore on Star Jalsha. She also took the role as Sati in the television event Durga Durgotinashini.

Filmography and Television

Television

Films

References

External links

Living people
Gokhale Memorial Girls' College alumni
University of Calcutta alumni
Rabindra Bharati University alumni
Bengali television actresses
1989 births